Janaka Rathnayake (born 10 June 1983) is a Sri Lankan cricketer. He made his List A debut on 22 December 2019, for Police Sports Club in the 2019–20 Invitation Limited Over Tournament. He made his Twenty20 debut on 12 January 2020, for Police Sports Club in the 2019–20 SLC Twenty20 Tournament.

References

External links
 

1983 births
Living people
Sri Lankan cricketers
Sri Lanka Police Sports Club cricketers
Place of birth missing (living people)